The Shirlen Big Cootie is an American homebuilt biplane that was designed by Roy Shirlen.

Design and development
The Big Cootie is a modernized version of the Powell PH Racer biplane for homebuilt construction. The aircraft is a single seat biplane with conventional landing gear, designed for mild aerobatics. The fuselage is welded steel tube construction with aircraft fabric covering. The cowling is fiberglass. The ailerons are controlled with push-pull tubes. The wings use wooden spars with plywood leading edges.

Operational history
The prototype survived an in-flight impact with powerlines during its initial testing. It was rebuilt at the Piedmont Aerospace Institute at Smith Reynolds Airport in Winston-Salem, North Carolina. A Continental A-80  engine replaced the Lycoming O-145  engine installed in the prototype.

Specifications (Shirlen Big Cootie)

See also

References

Homebuilt aircraft